Lozynskyi is the surname of the following people
Roman Lozynskyi (born in 1994), Ukrainian politician
Volodymyr Lozynskyi (1955-2020), Ukrainian football player and coach
Yevhen Lozynskyi (born in 1982), Ukrainian football defender

See also
Łoziński